Jean Leclerc (born May 14, 1961) is a Québécois singer-songwriter and author from Sainte-Foy, Quebec, Canada. He is popularly known as Jean Leloup (which he likes to translate to John the Wolf), a stage name he kept using until 2006, when he temporarily changed his name to Jean Leclerc, only to resurrect his wolf character in August 2008. He is known for his colourful personality and unique musical style in the francophone rock community.

Biography
Born in Sainte-Foy in 1961 to Québécois parents, Jean Leclerc grew up in Africa, more precisely in Togo and Algeria. The culture and way of life of his host country had an important influence on him and influenced many of his songs. 

He learned to play guitar by listening to the Rolling Stones, the Beatles and Jimi Hendrix. He was also influenced by colorful French music icons such as Jacques Dutronc, Jacques Higelin, Serge Gainsbourg and Michel Polnareff.

He returned to Quebec in 1976, and appeared on the music scene in the 1980s. In 1983, he was noticed at the Festival international de la chanson de Granby  and participated in the rock opera Starmania in 1986. However, he quickly distanced himself from the latter because of its "clean" character. Opting for the stage name of Jean Leloup (nicknamed John the Wolf by fans and by himself), he appeared on stage in Montreal in the late 1980s. From the beginning of his career, he made waves with his provocative lyrics--in his song "1990", he compares the high-tech actions of Desert Storm to his sexual activities with his girlfriend.

His 1990 album L'amour est sans pitié was a hit outside of Quebec, and was released in the rest of Canada, France, the Netherlands, Belgium and Japan.

He was the recipient of a Félix Award in 1997, following the success of his 1996 album Le Dôme.

At the end of 2003, Leclerc retired the name Jean Leloup and went on hiatus from his recording career. In August 2005, he announced his temporary return to the music scene with a collaboration with a band called the Porn Flakes. A first single called "Les Corneilles" has been heard on Quebec's radio stations.

In the months preceding his return, Leclerc wrote the philosophical novel  (originally entitled ) under the pen name Massoud Al-Rachid; it was published on October 5, 2005 at Leméac editions. 

Leclerc released the album Mexico in September 2006, his first under the name Jean Leclerc.

Jean Leclerc returned to the stage on August 29, 2008 for the 400th year of Quebec City's founding. He revived the name Jean Leloup for the occasion. The show was held at the Colisée Pepsi. Although controversial, Jean Leclerc mentioned that the "last hour of the show was the best of his life".

Under the name Jean Leloup, Leclerc released the album Mille Excuses Milady (translated to "a thousand apologies, Milady") on April 28, 2009, the first since he publicly declared that he wouldn't produce another album.

In 2016, his album À Paradis City was nominated for the Juno Award for Album of the Year, and won the Juno Award for Francophone Album of the Year. He received another Juno Award nomination for Francophone Album of the Year at the Juno Awards of 2020, for his 2019 album L'Étrange pays.

Discography
1989: Menteur
1990: L'amour est sans pitié
1996: Le Dôme
1998: Les Fourmis
2002: La Vallée des réputations
2004: Exit (live album)
2005: Je joue de la guitare 1985–2003 (compilation)
2006: Mexico (as Jean Leclerc)
2009: Mille excuses Milady
2015: À Paradis City
2019: L'Étrange Pays

Collaborations
1997: Glee (with Bran Van 3000)
2001: Discosis (with Bran Van 3000)
2002: Jouisseland by Martin Villeneuve
2011: The Last Assassins (with The Last Assassins)

See also
List of Quebec musicians
Music of Quebec
Culture of Quebec

References

External links

1961 births
Living people
French Quebecers
Musicians from Quebec City
Canadian singer-songwriters
People from Sainte-Foy, Quebec City
French-language singers of Canada
Audiogram (label) artists
Juno Award for Francophone Album of the Year winners
Félix Award winners